Jacky Heung Cho is a Hong Kong actor. He is the elder son of film producer/presenter Charles Heung and his wife Tiffany Chen.

Personal life 
In December 2020, Heung applied for permanent residence in Taiwan; his application was denied in February 2021 on the basis of "danger of threatening national interest, public safety, or public order or engaging in terrorist activities." Additionally, Heung was reported by Taiwanese media to be a member of the pro-communist All-China Youth Federation.

Filmography

Reference

External links
 
 Jacky Heung at the Hong Kong Movie Database

1984 births
Living people
Hong Kong male film actors
Hong Kong people of Taiwanese descent
21st-century Hong Kong male actors